The Shadow DN4 is a sports prototype race car, built to Group 7 racing specifications, for competition in the Can-Am series, and later the World Sportscar Championship, in 1974 and 1976. Jackie Oliver successfully clinched 1974 Can-Am Championship season in this car, winning 4 out of the 5 races that season.

References

Sports prototypes
Can-Am cars
DN4